Iku, or Iku-Gora-Ankwa (Ekhwa), is a Plateau language of Nigeria.

References

External links
Ehwa wordlist

Central Plateau languages
Languages of Nigeria